ISG may refer to:

Academics
 Information Security Group, academic information security group in Royal Holloway, University of London
 Indian School, Al-Ghubra, a K-12 school in Muscat, Oman
 International School of Geneva, an international school in Geneva, Switzerland
 International School in Genoa, an international school in Genoa, Italy
 International School Groningen, an international school in Haren, Netherlands
 ISG Business School, a business school in Paris, France

Organisations
 Idaho State Guard, active during World War II
 Independent Senators Group, a Canadian Senate parliamentary group
 Interactive Support Group, a defunct CD-I development company
 International Steel Group, a steel company headquartered in Cleveland, Ohio
Interserve Group, a UK construction company
Iowa State Guard, active during World War II
ISG Ltd, a UK construction company

Transportation
 Integrated Starter-Generator, Part of an automotive start-stop system
 New Ishigaki Airport (IATA airport code) on Ishigaki Island, Okinawa, Japan

Other uses
 In Situ Gasification technology is the process used for Underground coal gasification (UCG)
 Instruction Stream Generator, also called Random test generator
 Interferon-stimulated genes, a varied group of genes that are switched on by interferon to tackle viral infection
 International Socialist Group, a Trotskyist group and British section of the Fourth International between 1987 and 2009
 Iraq Study Group, a 2006 congressionally appointed panel charged with assessing the situation in Iraq, also known as the Baker-Hamilton Commission
 Iraq Survey Group, the 2003–2005 investigative mission in the Iraqi WMD search program that produced the Duelfer Report